Jamie Harty is an Australian former professional tennis player.

Harty, a Wollongong native, trained at the Australian Institute of Sport and was runner-up to Pat Cash at the U16s national championships in 1980. A left-handed player, he competed in the men's singles main draw of the 1982 Australian Open. In 1983 he partnered with Des Tyson to win the Australian Open boys' doubles title.

References

External links
 
 

Year of birth missing (living people)
Living people
Australian male tennis players
Tennis people from New South Wales
Sportspeople from Wollongong
Australian Open (tennis) junior champions
Grand Slam (tennis) champions in boys' doubles